A list of films produced in the Cinema of Austria in the 1920s ordered by year of release. For an alphabetical list of articles on Austrian films see :Category:Austrian films.

1920

1921

1922

1923

1924

1925

1926

1927

1928

1929

References

External links
 Austrian film at the Internet Movie Database
 Austrian Film Commission – Website Home

1920s
Austrian
Films

de:Liste österreichischer Filme